Penryn is an unincorporated community and census-designated place (CDP) in Penn Township, Lancaster County, Pennsylvania, United States. As of the 2010 census the population was 1,024.

Geography
Penryn is in northern Lancaster County, north of the center of Penn Township.

Penryn is drained by tributaries of Chiques Creek, a south-flowing direct tributary of the Susquehanna River.

Demographics

References 

Populated places in Lancaster County, Pennsylvania
Census-designated places in Lancaster County, Pennsylvania